Canada is a country in the northern part of North America.
Canada is the world's eighth-largest economy , with a nominal GDP of approximately US$2.2 trillion. It is a member of the Organisation for Economic Co-operation and Development (OECD) and the Group of Seven (G7), and is one of the world's top ten trading nations, with a highly globalized economy. Canada is a mixed economy, ranking above the US and most western European nations on The Heritage Foundation's index of economic freedom, and experiencing a relatively low level of income disparity. The country's average household disposable income per capita is over US$23,900, higher than the OECD average. Furthermore, the Toronto Stock Exchange is the seventh-largest stock exchange in the world by market capitalization, listing over 1,500 companies with a combined market capitalization of over US$2 trillion .

For further information on the types of business entities in this country and their abbreviations, see "Business entities in Canada".

Largest firms 

This list shows firms in the Fortune Global 500, which ranks firms by total revenues reported before March 31, 2022. Only the top five firms (if available) are included as a sample.

Notable firms 
This list includes notable companies with primary headquarters located in the country. The industry and sector follow the Industry Classification Benchmark taxonomy. Organizations which have ceased operations are included and noted as defunct.

See also 

List of largest companies in Canada
List of largest public companies in Canada by profit
 List of Canadian mobile phone companies
 List of mutual fund companies in Canada
 List of Canadian telephone companies
 List of defunct Canadian companies
 List of government-owned companies

References 

Canada